Livingstone is a city in Zambia. Until 1935, it served as the capital city of Zambia (then Northern Rhodesia). Lying 10 km (6.2 mi) to the north of the Zambezi River, it is a tourism attraction center for the Victoria Falls and a border town with road and rail connections to Zimbabwe on the other side of the Victoria Falls. A historic British colonial city, its present population was enumerated at 134,349 inhabitants at the 2010 census. It is named after David Livingstone, the Scottish explorer and missionary who was the first European to explore the area.

Pre-colonial History
Mukuni,  to the south-east of present-day Livingstone, was the largest village in the area before Livingstone was founded. Its Baleya inhabitants, originally from the Rozwi culture in Zimbabwe, were conquered by Chief Mukuni who came from the Congo in the 16th century. Another group of Baleya under Chief Sekute lived near the river west of the town. These are southern Tonga people but are culturally and linguistically similar to the Baleya.

The Subiya paid tribute to the Lozi of Barotseland but in 1838 the Kololo, a Sotho tribe from South Africa displaced by Zulu wars, migrated north and conquered the Lozi. The Kololo placed chiefs of their subordinate Subiya people of Sesheke over the Tokaleya. In 1855 Scottish missionary traveller David Livingstone became the first European to be shown the Zambezi in Livingstone vicinity, to see Victoria Falls by the Subiya-Kololo Chief Sekeletu.

Colonial history
In the 1890s Cecil Rhodes' British South Africa Company established the British rule north of the Zambezi and launched a wave of mineral prospecting and exploration activity and as well ventured into other natural resources such as timber, ivory and animal skins in a territory called North-Western Rhodesia. The main crossing point of the Zambezi was above the falls at the Old Drift, first by dugout canoe, later by an iron boat propelled by eight Lozi paddlers, or a barge towed across with a steel cable. As the Old Drift crossing became frequently used, a British colonial settlement sprang up there and around 1897 it became the first municipality in the country,  and it is sometimes referred to as 'Old Livingstone'. Its proximity to mosquito breeding areas caused deaths from malaria, and so after 1900 the Europeans moved to higher ground known as Constitution Hill or Sandbelt Post Office, and as that area grew into a town it was named Livingstone in honour of the explorer.

The railway was extended to Hwange for the coal, but Rhodes' vision was to keep pushing north to extend the British Empire, and he would have built it to Cairo if he could. In 1904 the railway reached the Falls on the southern side and construction of the Victoria Falls Bridge started. Too impatient to wait for its completion, Rhodes had the line from Livingstone to Kalomo built and operations started some months in advance of the bridge using a single locomotive which was conveyed in pieces by temporary cableway across the gorge next to the bridge building site.

The city was founded in 1905. The British South Africa Company moved the capital of the territory there in 1907. In 1911 the company merged the territory with North-Eastern Rhodesia as Northern Rhodesia. Livingstone prospered from its position as a gateway to trade between north and south sides of the Zambezi, as well as from farming in the Southern Province and commercial timber production from forests to its north-west. A number of colonial buildings were erected which still stand. Although the capital was moved to Lusaka in 1935 to be closer to the economic heartland of the Copperbelt, industries based on timber, hides, tobacco, cotton (including textiles) and other agricultural products grew. A hydroelectric plant was built taking water from the Eastern Cataract of the Falls. The town of Victoria Falls in Southern Rhodesia had the tourist trade, but many supplies were bought from Livingstone.

Of all the towns in Northern Rhodesia, colonial Livingstone took on the most British character. Surrounded by large numbers of African settlements, it had a strongly marked segregation which while not being officially enshrined as an apartheid policy, had similar practical effects. The north and western areas of the town and the town centre were reserved for the colonial government and white-owned businesses and associated residential areas, while African townships such as Maramba (named after the small Maramba River flowing nearby) were in the east and south and were inhabited by working servants, craftsman, tradesman, as well as large numbers of non-working black families suffering under welfare dependency. Asians and people of mixed race owned businesses in the middle, on the eastern side of the centre.

As the British government began publicly discussing independence, and news of the large scale genocide of white colonials in nearby Belgian Congo was heard, many white residents  feared abandonment by the British colonial government. Consequently, many began making moves to migrate south toward Southern Rhodesia or South Africa. When Northern Rhodesia obtained independence as Zambia, many more whites continued to leave. At the end of British rule in 1964, Africans were handed a country in which there were only 100 black college graduates, almost all in social sciences from the University of Fort Hare in South Africa. In 1968, a one party state had been established which seized most remaining non-black property, especially those of whites. Consequently, most of the remaining Northern Rhodesians left after an official policy of nationalisation in Zambia was announced.

Post-independence 
Some colonial civic buildings were destroyed and replaced with an African architecture, although Livingstone was used as a location for a 1950s Rhodesian town in the 1981 movie The Grass Is Singing (based on the Doris Lessing novel of that name).
. At the same time, a large infusion of cash from the British government to Zambia at independence was partially used in Livingstone. Livingstone suffered economic decline in the 1970s due in part to renationalisation of industries and in part to closure of the border with Rhodesia, first by the Zambian government and later by the Rhodesian authorities.

In the last ten years, Livingstone has experienced a resurgence in tourism and has firmly become the destination of choice when visiting the Victoria Falls. Livingstone has enjoyed a slight influx of investment in the industry from modern hotel chains like Sun International, to some modern street strip mall centers and restaurants.

Climate
Livingstone has a hot semi-arid climate (Köppen: BSh) with hot and rainy wet seasons and very hot pre-wet seasons and mild dry seasons with large temperature differences between day and night.

Transport

Air 

The city is served by Harry Mwanga Nkumbula International Airport, which receives domestic flights from Lusaka and a year-round international connection to Johannesburg.

Rail 
The city is served by the operating sections of the Cape to Cairo Railway, which connect it to Lusaka in the north-east and Bulawayo in the south-east. The railway to Lusaka is also named the Zambia Railway. The Mulobezi Railway connects Livingstone to the Mulobezi timber industry in the west.

Road 
The Lusaka-Livingstone road (T1 road) connects Livingstone with Kalomo, Choma and the national capital (Lusaka) in the north-east. The same road connects southwards, crossing into Zimbabwe via Victoria Falls Bridge (weight restrictions apply) (becoming the A8 road on the Zimbabwean side and passing through Victoria Falls Town before proceeding to Bulawayo).

The M10 road connects westwards to Kazungula (where the Kazungula Bridge, formerly the Kazungula Ferry, connects with the border into Botswana) and to Sesheke (where it crosses the Zambezi as the Katima Mulilo Bridge and reaches the Katima Mulilo Border with Namibia). This road from Livingstone to the Katima Mulilo Bridge is part of the Walvis Bay-Ndola-Lubumbashi Development Road. The M10 further connects with Senanga and Mongu.

Places of worship    
Among the places of worship, they are predominantly Christian churches and temples : Roman Catholic Diocese of Livingstone (Catholic Church), United Church in Zambia (World Communion of Reformed Churches), Mount Zion Christian Centre - Livingstone (Pentecostal Church), Reformed Church in Zambia (World Communion of Reformed Churches), Baptist Union of Zambia (Baptist World Alliance), Assemblies of God. There are also Muslim mosques and Hindu temples. Previously, Livingstone hosted a strong Jewish community.

Culture 

Livingstone has various museums, like the Livingstone Museum (archaeology, ethnography and history and contains a collection of memorabilia relating to David Livingstone), the Maramba Cultural Museum (featuring traditional dancing, singing, costumes), the Railway Museum of the Mulobezi Railway and the Victoria Falls Field Museum (featuring geology and archaeology around the Falls.

Twin towns – sister cities

Livingstone is twinned with:
 Funchal, Portugal
 Santa Fe, United States

See also
Kafue Railway Bridge (Railroad bridge from Livingstone to Lusaka)
Victoria Falls, Zimbabwe (the adjacent Zimbabwean city)
Annual-State-of-Cross-Border-Operations-Report-2019-20.pdf (cbrta.co.za)

References

Bibliography 
 Apthorpe  R  (1960)-Rhodes  Livvingstone  Institute  Journal-Problems  of African History, the Nsenga of Northern Rhodesia (Government Printer, Lusaka) page 58.Colson E. and Gluckman M (1961)-Seven Tribes of British Central Africa – The plateau Tonga of Northern Rhodesia (Manchester University Press, Manchester) pages 95,103 and 129.Douglas S.D. (1961) – The Stories of the Ancient Lore of the Bene Mukuni page 19.Manchishi P.C. and Musona E.T. – The People of Zambia – The Short History of the Soli (Multimedia, Lusaka) page 2 Poole L. (1938) – The Native Tribes of the East Luangwa Province of Northern Rhodesia (Government Printer, Lusaka) page 45
 Muntemba, M (1970), Zambia Museums Journal, Volume 1- The Political and Ritual Sovereignty Among the Mukuni Leya of Zambia page 29. Mwale B.B. – About the Acewa, History and customs of the Cewa people chapter V.Poole L. (1938), The Native Tribes of the East Luangwa Province of Northern Rhodesia (Government Printer, Lusaka) page 45.Undi Gawa Kalonga Chivunga, Paramount Chief (1970) Interview.
 Brelsford , W. V. (1965) – The Tribes of Zambia – The Gwembe Valley People (Government Printer, Lusaka) page 73.Brelsford , W. V. (1965) – The Tribes of Zambia – The Lenje Soli People (Government Printer, Lusaka) page 75.Colson E. (1960)-Kariba Studies (Manchester University Press, Manchester) page 168.Colson E. and Gluckman M (1961)-Seven Tribes of British Central Africa – The plateau Tonga of Northern Rhodesia (Manchester University Press, Manchester) page 132.Fagan, B.M and Philipson D.W (1965), the Iron Age Sequence at Lochnivar and the Tonga, Journal of the Royal Anthropological Institute. Volume 95 part 2.Field, S. A. (1961) Visilano, History Project U.M.C.A Msoro. Chapters 41, 42, 43, 45, 46 and 47.Government  of  Zambia  –  Statutory  Instrument  number  146  of  1998 (Government Printer, Lusaka) page 521.Government of Zambia – Statutory Instrument numbers 22 and 23 of 1999 (Government Printer, Lusaka) page 43 and 45.Kaulu, M. G. (1995) District notes (ODG/SIN/102/15/2) – A Brief History of Mwemba Chieftainship pages 1, 2, 3, 4 and 5 Langworthy, H.W. (1972), Zambia Before 1890: Aspects of Pre-Colonial History (Dai Nippon Printing Company (HG) Limited Hong Kong) page 23.Liteta Chinkuli Wilson – Senior Chief Mukuni N’gombe (1990) interview.Malala Muzamba II- Be-Dyango XV (1958) interview.Mukuni Siloka II (1957), A Short History Of the Baleya People (Government Printer, Lusaka) pages 4, 5, 6 and 7.Muntemba, M (1970) Zambia Museums Journal Volume 1. The Political and Ritual Sovereighnty Among the Mukuni Leya of Zambia. page 29.Mwale B.B. – About the Acewa, History and customs of the Cewa people chapter V.Siampande Siamayuwa Senior Chief Mwemba (1990) interview.Sekute Kalonga Chief (1957) Interview
 Brelsford , W. V. (1965) – The Tribes of Zambia – The Gwembe Valley People (Government Printer, Lusaka) pages 70 and 72.Colson E. and Gluckman M (1961)-Seven Tribes of British Central Africa – The Lozi of Barotseland (Manchester University Press, Manchester) page 19.Colson E. and Gluckman M (1961)-Seven Tribes of British Central Africa – The Plateau Tonga (Manchester University Press, Manchester) page 96 Gyenkye (1996) The African Chief, page 109.Langworthy, H.W. (1972), Zambia Before 1890: Aspects of Pre-Colonial History (Dai Nippon Printing Company (HG) Limited Hong Kong) pages 25 and 119.Malala Muzamba II- Be-Dyango XV (1958) interview.Memo 376/27/5/B (1933)Minutes – Kalomo Native Authority meeting (1936)Malahasi Lwangulamombo, Sikukwila (1958) interview.Mubila Philemon, Mwendambeli (1987) interview.Munongo Bantu Mwenda Msiri Mwami (2006) interview.Muntemba, M (1970) Zambia Museums Journal Volume 1. The Political and Ritual Sovereighnty Among the Mukuni Leya of Zambia. pages 30, 31 and 32.Sialutaba Josephat, Mutoozi We Namunaki (1987) interview.Vogel Joseph, O. (1975) Simbusenga (Oxford University Press, Oxford) page 47.Yanina Munchindu, Inabuze (1987) Interview.
 Muntemba, M (1970) Zambia Museums Journal Volume I – The Political and Ritual Sovereignty Among the Mukuni Leya of Zambia – pages 30 and 34
 Malala Muzamba II Be-Dyango XV (1958) Interview.Mubila  Mwendambeli  (1986)  assisting  in  the  Siloka  III  Mukuni  XIX Investiture rites.Mukasimalweza Muzamba III Be-Dyango XVIII (1986)conducting coronation rites.Mukanyemba Mukalaso Siamachoka Mwanengwelele (1986) assisting in the Siloka III Mukuni XIX Investiture rites.Siloka III Mukuni XIX (1986) coronation rites, personal experience.
 Muntemba, M (1970) Zambia Museums Journal Volume I – The Political and Ritual Sovereignty Among the Mukuni Leya of Zambia – pages 30 and 34
 Malala Muzamba II Be-Dyango XV (1958) Interview.Mubila  Mwendambeli  (1986)  assisting  in  the  Siloka  III  Mukuni  XIX Investiture rites.Mukasimalweza Muzamba III Be-Dyango XVIII (1986)conducting coronation rites.Mukanyemba Mukalaso Siamachoka Mwanengwelele (1986) assisting in the Siloka III Mukuni XIX Investiture rites.Siloka III Mukuni XIX (1986) coronation rites, personal experience.

External links 

 Zambia National Tourist Bureau page
https://www.zambiatourism.com/towns/livingstone/

 
Provincial capitals in Zambia
Populated places in Southern Province, Zambia
Zambia–Zimbabwe border crossings
1897 establishments in the British Empire
David Livingstone